Irish Catholics are an ethnoreligious group native to Ireland whose members are both Catholic and Irish. They have a large diaspora, which includes over 36 million American citizens and over 14 million British citizens (a quarter of the British population).

Overview and history
Divisions between Irish Roman Catholics and Irish Protestants played a major role in the history of Ireland from the 16th century to the 20th century, especially during the Home Rule Crisis and the Troubles. While religion broadly marks the delineation of these divisions, the contentions were primarily political and they were also related to access to power. For example, while the majority of Irish Catholics had an identity which was independent from Britain's identity and were excluded from power because they were Catholic, a number of the instigators of rebellions against British rule were actually Protestant Irish nationalists, although most Irish Protestants opposed separatism. In the Irish Rebellion of 1798, Catholics and Presbyterians, who were not part of the established Church of Ireland, found common cause.

Irish Catholics are found in many countries around the world, especially in the Anglosphere. Emigration exponentially increased due to the Great Famine which lasted from 1845 to 1852. In the United States, anti-Irish sentiment and anti-Catholicism was espoused by the Know Nothing movement of the 1850s and other 19th-century anti-Catholic and anti-Irish organizations. By the 20th century, Irish Catholics were well established in the United States and today they are fully-integrated into mainstream American society.

See also
 Catholic Church in Ireland
 Celtic Christianity
 Cultural Christians
 Irish Americans
 Scotch-Irish Americans
 Irish migration to Britain
 Irish Canadians
 Irish Newfoundlanders
 Irish Quebecers
 Irish Scottish people
 Irreligion in the Republic of Ireland
 Penal Laws
 Religion in Northern Ireland
 Religion in the Republic of Ireland
 Saint Patrick's Day
 Ulster Protestants
 Ulster Scots people

References

Further reading

Catholic Irish
 Anbinder, Tyler (2002). Five Points: The Nineteenth-Century New York City Neighborhood That Invented Tap Dance, Stole Elections and Became the World's Most Notorious Slum. New York: Plume 
 Anbinder, Tyler, "Moving beyond 'Rags to Riches': New York's Irish Famine Immigrants and Their Surprising Savings Accounts," Journal of American History 99 (December 2012), 741–70.
 Barr, Colin (2020). Ireland's Empire: The Roman Catholic Church in the English-Speaking World, 1829–1914. Cambridge: Cambridge University Press. 
 Bayor, Ronald; Meagher, Timothy (eds.) (1997) The New York Irish. Baltimore: University of Johns Hopkins Press. 
 Blessing, Patrick J. (1992). The Irish in America: A Guide to the Literature and the Manuscript Editions. Washington, D.C.: Catholic University of America Press. 
 Clark, Dennis (1982). The Irish in Philadelphia: Ten Generations of Urban Experience (2nd Ed.). Philadelphia: Temple University Press. 
 English, T. J. (2005). Paddy Whacked: The Untold Story of the Irish American Gangster. New York: ReganBooks. 
 Ebest, Ron. "The Irish Catholic Schooling of James T. Farrell, 1914–23." Éire-Ireland 30.4 (1995): 18-32 excerpt.
 Erie, Steven P. (1988). Rainbow's End: Irish-Americans and the Dilemmas of Urban Machine Politics, 1840—1985. Berkeley, California: University of California Press. 
 Fanning, Charles, and Ellen Skerrett. "James T. Farrell and Washington Park: The Novel as Social History." Chicago History 8 (1979): 80–91.
 French, John. "Irish-American Identity, Memory, and Americanism During the Eras of the Civil War and First World War." (PhD Dissertation, Marquette University, 2012). Online 
 Gleeson. David T. The Green and the Gray: The Irish in the Confederate States of America (U of North Carolina Press, 2013); online review
 Ignatiev, Noel (1996). How the Irish Became White. New York: Routledge. 
 Jensen, Richard. (2002)  "'No Irish Need Apply': A Myth of Victimization". Journal of Social History 36.2 pp. 405–429 online 
 Kenny, Kevin. "Abraham Lincoln and the American Irish." American Journal of Irish Studies (2013): 39–64.
 Kenny, Kevin (2000). The American Irish: A History. New York: Longman, 2000. 
 McCaffrey, Lawrence J. (1976). The Irish Diaspora in America. Washington, D.C.: Catholic University of America 
 McKelvey, Blake. "The Irish in Rochester An Historical Retrospect." Rochester History 19: 1–16. online, on Rochester New York
 Meagher, Timothy J. (2000). Inventing Irish America: Generation, Class, and Ethnic Identity in a New England City, 1880–1928. Notre Dame, Indiana: University of Notre Dame Press. 
 Mitchell, Brian C. (2006). The Paddy Camps: The Irish of Lowell, 1821–61. Champaign, Illinois: University of Illinois Press. 
 Mulrooney, Margaret M. (ed.) (2003). Fleeing the Famine: North America and Irish Refugees, 1845–1851. New York: Praeger Publishers. 
 Noble, Dale T. (1986). Paddy and the Republic: Ethnicity and Nationality in Antebellum America. Middleton, Connecticut: Wesleyan University Press. 
 O'Connor, Thomas H. (1995). The Boston Irish: A Political History. Old Saybrook, Connecticut: Konecky & Konecky. 
 O'Donnell, L. A. (1997). Irish Voice and Organized Labor in America: A Biographical Study. Westport, Connecticut: Greenwood Press.
 Rogers, James Silas and Matthew J O'Brien, eds. After the Flood: Irish America, 1945–1960 (2009), Specialized essays by scholars
 Sim, David. (2013) A Union Forever: The Irish Question and US Foreign Relations in the Victorian Age (Cornell University Press, 2013)
 The Irish Cultural, Political, Social, and Religious Heritages
 Ireland: The Rise of Irish Nationalism, 1801–1850
 Emigrants and Immigrants
 Communities in Conflict: American Nativists and Irish Catholics
 Irish-American Politics 
 Irish America and the Course of Irish Nationalism
 From Ghetto to Suburbs: From Someplace to Noplace?
 Endnotes

External links
 Library of Congress 
 The Irish Catholic Diaspora in America, describes the book 
 On Irish Catholics of Australia

 
Ethnoreligious groups in Ireland
History of Catholicism in Ireland
Irish diaspora